Jersson Amur González Díaz (born February 16, 1975) is a Colombian football manager and former player who played as a defender or a defensive midfielder. He is the current manager of Categoría Primera B club Llaneros.

González was notable for being an experienced free-kick taker and possessing great ball control.

Career
González played for the Colombia national football team in the Copa América 2001 which they won. He also won the Colombian League with América de Cali in 1997 and 2000.

González has played for various Colombian teams and other international teams from Turkey and Argentina. He played for América de Cali, Deportivo Pereira, Centauros in Colombia, Club Atlético River Plate in Argentina and Galatasaray in Turkey.

González played for Colombia at the 1993 FIFA World Youth Championship in Australia.

Coaching career
González started his coaching career in 2013, where he became manager of Boyacá Chicó's U20 squad.

From 2014 to 2017, González was the manager of América de Cali's U20 squad. Through a video broadcast by América de Cali on its official YouTube channel, it was learned that Jersson González was appointed as the new manager of the women's team for the 2018 season.

On 20 August 2018, he was appointed caretaker manager for the first team of América de Cali. He was in charge for one game against Millonarios which he lost 0-2 and was replaced a few days later by a newly appointed manager. After Fernando Castro Lozada was fired on 15 April 2019, González was once again appointed caretaker manager, this time until the end of the season. He was recalled by América de Cali as caretaker on 28 April 2021, replacing Juan Cruz Real for the return leg of the quarter-finals of the 2021 Apertura tournament against Millonarios and four Copa Libertadores group stage games.

Following the end of América's involvement at the Copa Libertadores, he returned to the club's youth ranks, resigning on 2 April 2022 to become manager of Llaneros in the Colombian second tier league.

References

External links

 

1975 births
Living people
Footballers from Cali
Colombian footballers
América de Cali footballers
Galatasaray S.K. footballers
Club Atlético River Plate footballers
Centauros Villavicencio footballers
Deportivo Pereira footballers
Boyacá Chicó F.C. footballers
Atlético Bucaramanga footballers
Categoría Primera A players
Argentine Primera División players
Süper Lig players
Colombian expatriate footballers
Expatriate footballers in Argentina
Expatriate footballers in Turkey
Colombia under-20 international footballers
Colombia international footballers
1999 Copa América players
2001 Copa América players
Copa América-winning players
Association football fullbacks
Footballers at the 1995 Pan American Games
Pan American Games bronze medalists for Colombia
Pan American Games medalists in football
Medalists at the 1995 Pan American Games
21st-century Colombian people